Merle Frohms (born 28 January 1995) is a German professional footballer who plays as a goalkeeper for Frauen-Bundesliga club VfL Wolfsburg and the Germany national team.

Club career
Merle Frohms played together with boys for Fortuna Celle until 2011 and was signed by VfL Wolfsburg in late 2010. In her first season, she was part of the second team but wasn't used. On 9 December 2012, she debut in a 3–0 victory against FSV Gütersloh 2009 in what was her only game for the 2012–13 season. The following season she was moved to the second team as she played in sixteen matches for the team in the 2. Frauen-Bundesliga as the team finished in third place.

The 2014–15 season initially saw her contract being extended for another two years with sport director, Ralf Kellermann stating that "she has a great goalkeeping talent with such a perspective". It was during this season that she played another three games for the main club which included an appearance in the Champions League when she was a starter in the semi-final against Paris Saint-Germain. During this contract she was a substitute in both Wolfsburg victories in the DFB-Pokal Frauen in  2014–15 and 2015–16.

After another two years in the team, she moved to fellow Bundesliga club SC Freiburg where she played in 18 games for the club in the first season.

Frohms joined Eintracht Frankfurt in 2020, the club's first signing after it merged with 1. FFC Frankfurt.

International career
Frohms first appearance in an international tournament was the finals of the 2012 UEFA Women's Under-17 Championship where she played as the main keeper in the semi-final role against Denmark before stopping penalties from Chloé Froment and Ghoutia Karchouni in the final to give Germany the Under-17 title and also gaining a spot in the FIFA U-17 World Cup. Later that year she was chosen as the main goalkeeper for Germany at the 2012 FIFA U-17 Women's World Cup where she would play in all six of the matches as the national team finished in fourth place.

Career statistics

International

Honours
VfL Wolfsburg
UEFA Women's Champions League : 2012–13, 2013–14
Frauen-Bundesliga : 2012–13, 2013–14, 2016–17, 2017–18
DFB Pokal : 2012–13, 2014–15, 2015–16, 2016–17, 2017–18
Germany
 UEFA Women's Championship runner-up: 2022

Germany U20
FIFA U-20 Women's World Cup: 2014
Germany U17
UEFA Women's Under-17 Championship: 2012

References

External links

1993 births
Living people
People from Celle
German women's footballers
VfL Wolfsburg (women) players
SC Freiburg (women) players
Eintracht Frankfurt (women) players
Women's association football goalkeepers
Germany women's international footballers
Frauen-Bundesliga players
2019 FIFA Women's World Cup players
Footballers from Lower Saxony
UEFA Women's Euro 2022 players